The 1913 Arizona football team was an American football team that represented the University of Arizona as an independent during the 1913 college football season. In its first and only season under head coach Frank A. King, the team compiled a 2–2 record and was outscored by their opponents, 42 to 25. The team captain was Jay Angus McIntosh.

Schedule

References

Arizona
Arizona Wildcats football seasons
Arizona football